Alimukku is a small town which situated on the Punalur-Muvattupuzha State Highway (SH-08) in Kollam district, about 5 kilometres northwest of Punalur and 8 km from Pathanapuram. Other nearby places include Punnala (4 km), Karavoor (5 km), and Pathanamthitta (30 km).

The head office of Piravanthoor Panchayat is located here.

Nearby locations of interest include the Achenkovil Sastha temple (37 km away on the Alimukku-kottakkayam-mullumala-achenkovil route), Ayiravalli Shiva temple (one of the rarest shiva temples in Alimukku, having nadaraja vigraha in kerala), State Farming Corporation of Kerala (SFCK) Ltd, and a government cooperative college founded in 2011.

The Alimukku-Karavoor road is a bypass road for "sabarimala" travellers.

Religious Institutions
 Alimukku Aayiravilly Sree Mahadeva Temple
 Alimukku Anakulam Sree Durga Devi Temple
 Holy Family Catholic Church, Alimukku

References

Villages in Kollam district